The 44th Assembly district of New York is a district in Kings County made up by the neighborhoods of Park Slope, Windsor Terrace, Kensington, Borough Park, Victorian Flatbush, Ditmas Park and Midwood.

Leadership
The 44th District of New York is currently represented by Democrat Robert C. Carroll. Carroll was elected in 2016.

Recent election results

2022

2020

2018

2016

2014

2012

2010

References 

Politics of Brooklyn
44